Stephen Morgan is a meteorologist and host for Fox Weather. He leads coverage for the streaming service’s main weekday hours. Morgan is based in New York City, coming from his previous position as meteorologist at KRIV-TV in Houston. He moved to the East Coast with his husband Steven Romo in 2021.

Early life

Morgan grew up in the suburbs of Saint Louis. His family was deeply religious, attending an Assemblies of God church. In an interview with The Advocate, Morgan said he figured out early on he is gay, and he fasted and prayed asking God to "fix" him. Eventually, he came out to his parents and sister, hoping they could assist him in "obeying God" by not being gay. He spoke of a slow process and eventual turning point he and his family underwent before ultimately realizing Morgan was exactly as God made him.

Personal life

Morgan announced his engagement to NBC News correspondent Steven Romo in July 2021. The pair reportedly met in Houston while covering Hurricane Harvey and began dating thereafter. News of the engagement went viral and made headlines in mainstream and gay publications worldwide, including Yahoo! News, E! News, Miami Herald, Houston Chronicle, Kansas City Star, Fort Worth Star Telegram, Instinct (magazine), Out (magazine), DNA (magazine), The Advocate (LGBT magazine) and more.

The couple married on October 8, 2022 in Dallas, Texas at a venue on White Rock Lake in front of 125 guests. Their wedding also garnered a great deal of media attention, appearing in The New York Times Sunday Styles section, People Magazine and more.

Career

Morgan joined Fox Weather from the FOX-owned station in Houston, Texas. He serves as meteorologist, anchor and host of the main daypart programming.

Morgan is a graduate of Saint Louis University with a degree in meteorology.

See also
 LGBT culture in New York City
 List of LGBT people from New York City
 New Yorkers in journalism

References

Living people
1989 births
American television journalists
Television anchors from Houston
Television meteorologists in New York City
American television meteorologists
LGBT people from Missouri